The N2 road in Zimbabwe is a road connecting Harare-Borrowdale and Brooke.

Roads in Zimbabwe